Alpha Beta Gamma is a 2021 Indian Hindi-language romantic comedy film directed by debutant Shankar Srikumar and starring Nishan, Amit Kumar Vashisth, and Reena Aggarwal. The story and screenplay is written by Menka Sharma and Shankar. The film is produced by Jithin Raj, Mona Shankar, Thomas Punnoose, and Menka Sharma. The film is a joint venture between Choti Film Productions & Knownsense Entertainment.

Kartik Kumar Bhagat was the film's cinematographer, and its soundtrack and score are composed by Biplaab Dutta.

Alpha Beta Gamma was world premiered at the 52nd International Film Festival of India at Goa, in the Indian Panorama feature film segment on 24 November 2021. It's a first and debut for most of the people associated with the film. The movie was one of the only two Hindi films to be screened under Indian Panorama in the feature film segment out of 221 applications.

Cast 

 Nishan as Raviraj Varma
 Amit Kumar Vashisth as Chiranjeev Vashishth
 Reena Aggarwal as Mitali Chauhan

Production 
The movie was shot in Pune during the COVID-19 pandemic with limited crew members.

Screenings 
Alpha Beta Gamma was world premiered at 52nd International Film Festival of India in features film category of 'Indian Panorama' section for screening in November. The film will also be screened at Cannes Film Festival in Marché du Film held along 2022 edition of the festival on 22 May at Palais des Festivals, where India was announced as the official 'country of honour'.

Awards and nominations

References

External links 

 

2021 films
2020s Hindi-language films
2021 romantic comedy films
Indian romantic comedy films